The Hole in the Wall is a restaurant and bar located in Sliema, Malta. 

According to The Times of Malta it is the oldest bar in Sliema.  Loving Malta merely calls it one of the oldest.  According to the bar's web-site it was originally a stables, and was turned into a bar in 1922 by Manuel Scicluna.  The website notes "At the time, it was literally a hole in the wall, with no seating & selling take-away wine from huge vats."

Originally the owners sold wine from vats, to offduty airmen and soldiers, who referred to the then unnamed venue as "the hole in the wall".

From 1959 to 2005 the bar was owned and operated by Joseph Mifsud followed by Spiru Micallef to Anthony Bartolo and his sons.  The Bartolos were from a family that specialised in food and catering, and the family owned several restaurants, including one next door.  According to The Times of Malta, subsequent owners made bad management decisions, and the venue was in decline.

Ian Schranz described the bar, when he bought it, as a sports bar, where male patrons arrived in a group, to watch sporting events on TV, got loudly drunk, and hooted and hollered at women passing on the street.  Schranz described some of the steps he and his brother and co-owner took to attract a different clientele, starting with no longer tuning in to sporting events.

Schranz, an indie rock musician, says they bought the bar on a dare, and had to spend their first six months learning how bars operate.

When The Times of Malta reported that the government of Malta had shut down all pubs and restaurants as a precaution arising from the spread of the Covid 19 virus it noted that The Hole in the Wall had already shut down, due to the downturn in business due to the virus.

References

External links
 Lonely Planet
 Lovin Malta

Bars (establishments)